Fischbach is a commune and village in central Luxembourg. It is part of the canton of Mersch, which is part of the district of Luxembourg.

, the village of Fischbach, which lies in the centre of the commune, had a population of 178.  Other towns within the commune include Angelsberg and Schoos.  Fischbach is the site of Fischbach Castle, one of the private residences of the Grand Ducal family.

Population

See also
List of villages in Luxembourg

References

External links

 
Communes in Mersch (canton)
Villages in Luxembourg